The Tucson Gila Monsters were a short-lived American professional minor league ice hockey team based in Tucson, Arizona. The team played throughout the 1997–98 season, but folded after 21 games during the 1998–99 season.

The Gila Monsters, named after the gila monster native to the southwestern United States, were a member team of the West Coast Hockey League.

Season-by-season record 
Note: GP = Games played, W = Wins, L = Losses, OTL = Overtime losses, SOL = Shootout losses, Pts = Points, GF = Goals for, GA = Goals against, PIM = Penalties in minutes

Final records.

References

Ice hockey teams in Arizona
Sports in Tucson, Arizona
Ice hockey clubs established in 1997
Sports clubs disestablished in 1999
1997 establishments in Arizona
1999 disestablishments in Arizona
West Coast Hockey League teams